Pablo Álvarez may refer to:
Pablo Álvarez (footballer, born 1980), Spanish footballer
Pablo Álvarez (footballer, born 1997), Spanish footballer
Pablo Álvarez (Argentine footballer) (born 1984), Argentine footballer
Pablo Álvarez (Uruguayan footballer) (born 1985), Uruguayan footballer
Pablo Álvarez (German footballer) (born 1988), German footballer on List of German football transfers summer 2011
Pablo Álvarez (sport shooter) (born 1978), Argentine sport shooter
Pablo Gómez Álvarez (born 1946), Mexican politician

ru:Альварес, Пабло